This is a filmography of Welsh actor Ray Milland, containing his work in theatrically released motion pictures as well as his extensive television credits. Milland began his film career in United Kingdom in 1929 after serving three years as a guardsman in the Royal Household Cavalry, based in London. After appearing in several British films, he came to the United States in 1930 where he spent several years playing small and supporting roles. Eventually, in 1934, he became a contract player at Paramount Pictures where he established himself as a popular star. Milland remained with Paramount for the next 21 years. During his time with the studio, he developed his persona as a debonair leading man, mainly in drawing-room comedies but also occasionally in adventure and mystery films. In 1945, Milland won the Academy Award for Best Actor for his portrayal of an alcoholic writer in The Lost Weekend. From there he continued as a leading man well into the 1960s, appearing in several film noirs and occasionally cast as a villain. In 1953, Milland began working in television as both an actor and director. He alternated between the mediums of film and television for the remainder of his career. During the 1960s and 1970s, Milland frequently worked in science fiction and horror films. He also directed himself in four films.

The lists below chronicle Ray Milland's work in both film and television. Because his work in both mediums was extensive, the lists are divided on a decade-by-decade basis. The television section also contains episode listings for Milland's two series, Meet Mr. McNulty and Markham.

Filmography

1929–1940

1941–1950 

Directed by Edmund Goulding, Cedric Hardwicke, Frank Lloyd, Victor Saville, Robert Stevenson, Herbert Wilcox,  and René Clair.  Wilcox directed the sequence featuring Milland.

1951–1960

1961–1970

1971–1984

Television

General credits: 1953–1960

General credits: 1961–1970

General credits: 1971–1980

General credits: 1981–1986

Meet Mr. McNutley episodes

Markham episodes

Notes

References 
 
 
 
 Ray Milland awards at the Internet Movie Database
 Ray Milland TV appearances at the Internet Movie Database

Male actor filmographies
British filmographies
American filmographies